This is a list of the top 100 Major League Baseball (MLB) right fielders in career Jaffe Wins Above Replacement Score (JAWS). JAWS is a sabermetric stat developed by statistician Jay Jaffe to determine a player's rank at their position in relation to worthiness for election into the National Baseball Hall of Fame. 

Babe Ruth is the all-time leader for right fielders with a value of 124 JAWS. The active leader is Mookie Betts with a value of 51.2 JAWS.

Key

List
 Stats updated as of August 5, 2022

See also

Jaffe Wins Above Replacement Score

Notes

Sources

Jaffe Wins Above Replacement Score